The Fundación Patrimonio Fílmico Colombiano is a film archive in Bogotá, Colombia.

See also 
 List of film archives

External links 
 http://www.patrimoniofilmico.org.co

Film archives in South America
Archives in Colombia
Buildings and structures in Bogotá